Drayson may refer to:

 Alfred Wilks Drayson (1827–1901), English army officer, author and astronomer.
 Burnaby Drayson (1913–1983), British Conservative politician.
 Paul Drayson, Baron Drayson (born 1960), British businessman and politician, founder of Drayson Racing.
 Robert Drayson DSC (1919–2008), an English naval officer and schoolmaster
 Zac Drayson (born 1983), Australian actor.